The Gottleuba Dam is the second highest dam in Saxony, Germany. It serves as a reservoir for water supply for the town Pirna and provides flood protection, but energy production is small. The dam was built between 1965 and 1974. It is located at the northern foot of the Erzgebirge, southwest of Bad Gottleuba. It dams up the Gottleuba river.

Above the concrete dam is a lookout point. The dam is not accessible to the public.  Bathing and leisure sport in the lake is not allowed, since it is for drinking water. Entry around the lake is allowed.

See also 
 Reservoirs and dams in Germany

External links 
 Information on Gottleuba Dam

Dams in Saxony
Dams completed in 1976
Bad Gottleuba-Berggießhübel
Buildings and structures in Sächsische Schweiz-Osterzgebirge